Augustus William Harvey (May 31, 1839 – February 7, 1903) was an industrialist and politician in Newfoundland. He served in the Legislative Council of Newfoundland from 1870 to 1895 and represented Harbour Grace in the Newfoundland House of Assembly from 1900 to 1904 as a Liberal.

He was born in Bermuda and was educated at the University of Pennsylvania. Harvey came to Newfoundland in 1853. In 1861, he joined Dunscombe, Harvey and Company, later known as Harvey and Company; his uncle Eugenius Harvey was part owner of the firm. When his uncle left, he became managing partner. Originally a fishery supply business, the company expanded into mining, lumber and manufacturing. He was also a partner in A. Harvey and Company and the New York, Newfoundland and Halifax Steamship Company. In 1894, he became an agent for the Dominion Coal Company of Cape Breton. Harvey established the Cabot Steam Whaling Company in 1896.

In 1864, Harvey married Elizabeth Walker.

In 1870, Harvey was named to the Newfoundland Legislative Council. He was opposed to union with Canada and supported the construction of a railway across the colony. He served as chairman of a committee tasked with deciding how Newfoundland should set up a fisheries commission; he later became chair of the commission. In 1889, he was named to the Newfoundland cabinet, responsible for the fisheries commission. From 1893 to 1896, he was head of the fisheries ministry.  Harvey resigned from the Legislative Council and the cabinet in December 1895. This was in part due to the collapse of the Union and Commercial banks in 1894; Harvey had been a director for the Union bank as well as a major client of the bank. In 1900, he was elected to the Newfoundland assembly and he served in the cabinet as a minister without portfolio.

Harvey helped establish the Fishermen and Sailors' Home in 1886. He was also a member of the committee set up to help Doctor Wilfred Grenfell provide medical care in Labrador.

He died in St. John's at the age of 63.

References 

Members of the Newfoundland and Labrador House of Assembly
Members of the Legislative Council of Newfoundland
Members of the Executive Council of Newfoundland and Labrador
1839 births
1903 deaths
British emigrants to pre-Confederation Newfoundland
Newfoundland Colony people